Louisa Jane Hamilton may refer to:

Louisa Jane Russell, Louisa Jane (Russell) Hamilton, 1st Duchess of Abercorn
Louisa Montagu-Douglas-Scott, Duchess of Buccleuch and Queensberry, née Louisa Hamilton, 6th Duchess of Buccleuch & 8th Duchess of Queensberry